Bernard John Gehrmann (February 13, 1880 – July 12, 1958) was a U.S. Representative from Wisconsin.

Born in Gnesen, near Königsberg, East Prussia, Germany, Gehrmann attended the common schools in Germany. In 1893, Gehrmann immigrated to the United States with his parents, who settled in Chicago, Illinois. He was employed in a packing plant in Chicago, Illinois, and later learned the printing trade on a German-language daily newspaper. He attended night school. He moved to Wisconsin and settled on a farm near Neillsville, in Clark County in 1896 and engaged in agricultural pursuits. He moved to a farm near Mellen, Wisconsin, in Ashland County in 1915.

He served as clerk of the school board 1916–1934, town assessor 1916–1921, and chairman of the town board from 1921 to 1932. Gehrmann conducted farmers' institutes throughout the State for the University of Wisconsin College of Agriculture from 1920 to 1933. He served in the Wisconsin State Assembly from 1927 to 1933. He was a delegate to the Republican National Convention in 1932. He served as member of the Wisconsin State Senate in 1933 and 1934.

Gehrmann was elected as a Progressive to the Seventy-fourth and to the three succeeding Congresses (January 3, 1935 – January 3, 1943). He represented Wisconsin's 10th congressional district. He was an unsuccessful candidate for reelection in 1942 to the Seventy-eighth Congress. He engaged in work for the United States Department of Agriculture from January 1943 to April 1945. Gehrmann was elected to the Wisconsin State Assembly in 1946, 1948, 1950, and 1952. He was elected to the Wisconsin State Senate in 1954 for the term ending in January 1957.

He died of a heart attack in Mellen, Wisconsin, July 12, 1958. He was interred in Mellen Union Cemetery.

His son was Bernard E. Gehrmann, who also served in the Wisconsin State Assembly.

References

1880 births
1958 deaths
Members of the United States House of Representatives from Wisconsin
Wisconsin state senators
Members of the Wisconsin State Assembly
Wisconsin Progressives (1924)
People from Ashland County, Wisconsin
People from Neillsville, Wisconsin
Progressive Party (1924) members of the United States House of Representatives
20th-century American politicians
German emigrants to the United States